Zahir is an Arabic surname. Notable people with the surname include:

Abdul Zahir (Afghan Prime Minister) (1910–1983), former prime minister of Afghanistan
Abdul Zahir (Guantanamo Bay detainee 753) (born 1972), Guantanamo Bay detainee
Ahmad Zahir (1946–1979), Singer from Afghanistan
Mohommad Zahir (born 1953), Guantanamo Bay detainee
Mohamed Zahir (born c. 1950), Chief of Staff of the Republic of Maldives National Defence Force

Arabic-language surnames